Elections in Georgia may refer to:

 Elections in Georgia (country)
 Elections in Georgia (U.S. state)